Lok Tsui is one of the 31 constituencies of the Tuen Mun District Council, one of the nine local councils in the New Territories, Hong Kong. Located in the far west end of the district, the seat elects one member of the council every four years. Since its creation in 1994, the seat has been held by the Democratic Party except for a brief period from 2015 to 2019, when it was held by pro-Beijing independent councillor Junius Ho.

The seat was held by Democratic Party former chairman Albert Ho until he was unseated by Junius Ho in the 2015 Hong Kong District Council election. The constituency has attracted huge attention from the media during 2019 elections, owing to the accusation of Ho's involvement in 2019 Yuen Long attack and the controversial speech of Ho. Lo Chun-yu from the Democratic Party ran the election in this constituency, but has been threatened, tracked and assaulted by different means before the polling day.

It covers Melody Garden, San Shek Wan, Pak Kok, Black Point, Tap Shek Kok, Lung Kwu Tan, and the northeastern two-thirds of the 13L/31R runway (the "third runway") of the Chek Lap Kok Airport.

Councillors represented

Election results

2010s

2000s

1990s

References

External links
2011 District Council Election Results (Tuen Mun)
2007 District Council Election Results (Tuen Mun)
2003 District Council Election Results (Tuen Mun)
1999 District Council Election Results (Tuen Mun)
 

Constituencies of Hong Kong
Constituencies of Tuen Mun District Council
1994 establishments in Hong Kong
Constituencies established in 1994